The Swedish Chronicle (Vetus chronicon sveciae prosaicum or Prosaiska krönikan) is a mid-15th century chronicle on a nation called Getae (gethe), Goths (gotha), Geats (götha) and eventually Swedes (swenske). It says that it is compiled from ancient chronicles.

It includes a line of kings from the House of Yngling which appears to be based on the Norwegian Historia Norwegiæ and the Danish Chronicon Lethrense, but the compiler seems to have corrected the information.

Line of kings
The first part of its line of Swedish kings:
Inge (Yngvi, here the son of Filimer)
Neorch and Froe (Njord and Freyr)
Urbar (made his son Dan king of Denmark and his son Nore the king of Norway)
Östen
Solen (was drowned in a vat of mead like Fjölnir)
Swerker
Valand
Wisbur
Domalde (was sacrificed to a troll named Ceres)
Domar
Attila (made the Danes accept the dog king as their king)
Dyguer
Dager
Alrik (was killed by his brother Erik with a rein)
Ingemar (was hanged by his wife in Agnafit)
Ingeller (was killed by his own brother)
Järunder
Hakon (killed Harald Wartooth at the Battle of Brávellir and became so old that he had to feed by suckling a horn)
Eghil 
Oktar (killed by his brother Faste)
Adhel (died when he fell off his horse during the sacrifices)
Östen (was arsoned to death)
Ingemar 
Bräntemundher (was killed by his own brother Sigurd in Närke)
Ingeller (was so afraid of Ivar the far-travelled that he arsoned himself to death)
Olaffver trätelge
Inge (died in battle)
Erik Weatherhat
Eric the Victorious
Stenkil of Good Harvests (the first Christian king)
Olof Skötkonung

Sources and external links
The Swedish Chronicle, in the original language (rtf).
Anderson, Carl Edlund. Formation and Resolution of Ideological Contrast in the Early History of Scandinavia. Ph.D. thesis, University of Cambridge, Department of Anglo-Saxon, Norse & Celtic (Faculty of English)

Scandinavian chronicles
15th-century Latin books
15th-century history books
15th century in Sweden
Historiography of Sweden